Carwyn Ellis (born Carwyn Meurig Ellis; 9 August 1973) is a Welsh musician, composer, arranger, multi-instrumentalist and record producer. He is known as the frontman of British alternative band Colorama, as a member of The Pretenders and as a long-time collaborator with Edwyn Collins. In 2014, they worked together on the soundtrack to the film The Possibilities Are Endless which won the Mojo 'Film of the Year' Award.

Ellis has also recorded electronic music as Zarelli, releasing an album, Soft Rains in 2015 which featured the voice of Leonard Nimoy narrating the Ray Bradbury short story There Will Come Soft Rains. 
In 2017 Ellis formed the Welsh folk group Bendith and their self-titled album was nominated for the Welsh Music Prize and went on to win the Welsh Language Album of the Year 2017 award at National Eisteddfod of Wales. 

Since 2016 Ellis has hosted a regular themed radio show on Soho Radio.

In 2019, Ellis embarked on the first solo project under his own name, Carwyn Ellis & Rio 18. A collaborative project sung in Welsh and recorded mainly in Rio de Janeiro. The album, Joia! was nominated for the Welsh Music Prize. A documentary film on the making of the record, Carwyn Ellis: Ar Y Cei Yn Rio went on to win the Best Welsh language short Film award at the Wales International Documentary Festival.

In 2020, Ellis releases Single Cherry Blossom Promenade and EP Ti to raise funds for personal protective equipment (PPE) for Welsh health and care workers.

During lockdown in UK, Ellis released Chaos Wonderland under the Colorama project on 31 July 2020  and the follow-up to 2019’s Welsh Music Prize shortlisted Joia!, Ellis released Carwyn Ellis & Rio 18's second album Mas on 25 February 2021.

The most recent album Yn Rio by the Carwyn Ellis & Rio 18 features the BBC National Orchestra of Wales was released on 22 October 2021, originally performed live and broadcast in March 2021 on BBC Radio Cymru and BBC Radio 6 Music.

Career
After a nomadic early childhood moving from town to town, Ellis' family settled in Anglesey, eventually moving to London where he studied at the Royal Academy of Music and worked with numerous bands through a myriad of genres.

Among the artists that Ellis has collaborated or performed with are The Pretenders, Edwyn Collins, Saint Etienne, Sarah Cracknell, Oasis, Shane MacGowan, UNKLE, North Mississippi Allstars, James Hunter, Roddy Frame, Thee Hypnotics, The 2 Bears, Tracyanne & Danny, Gemma Ray, Lay Low (Sri Lankan-Icelandic artist) and Quruli (Japanese artist).

In 2008 Ellis moved to Cardiff, emerging as a frontman in his own right and calling his band Colorama. They released their Japan-only debut album Cookie Zoo on Noise McCartney in April 2008, and released their debut single Sound via Redbricks Recordings in July 2008.

In 2009, Colorama announced that their double bass player, Ellis's best friend David Fletcher, had died at the age of 37 on 29 June, from a heart attack suffered in his sleep, just days after Colorama's appearance at Glastonbury Festival.

September 2009 saw the UK release of Colorama's album Magic Lantern Show on Redbricks Recordings, featuring songs in Welsh and English. Magic Lantern Show was enthusiastically received with extensive radio play on XFM, BBC 6 Music, BBC Radio 1, BBC Radio Wales, C2 and BBC Radio Cymru.

Early in 2010, Ellis joined forces with Shane MacGowan, Nick Cave, Bobby Gillespie, Chrissie Hynde, Mick Jones, Glen Matlock, Paloma Faith, Cait O'Riordan, Johnny Depp, Robert and James Walbourne, to release a charity single covering the Screamin' Jay Hawkins hit I Put a Spell on You. All the proceeds from the single went to Concern Worldwide to provide assistance to the victims of the earthquake that devastated Haiti.

In autumn 2010, Ellis released Colorama's third album BOX on Noise McCartney / Bad News Records (Victor Entertainment) in Japan and via See Monkey Do Monkey Recordings in UK. Shortly afterwards, they released a Christmas single, Cerdyn Nadolig (Christmas Card), which garnered them the Welsh Christmas Number 1 on the BBC Radio Cymru chart. BOX was also nominated for the inaugural Welsh Music Prize.

Amid other projects, Ellis produced and arranged Italian artist Emma Tricca's album Minor White, which was released on Finders Keepers / Bird Records in the UK, and he worked with French artist Fabienne Delsol on her album ON MY MIND (Damaged Goods), also Dan Sartain's album Dan Sartain Lives (One Little Indian Records), The Keys' album - Fire Inside (See Monkey Do Monkey Recordings) and Edwyn Collins' album Losing Sleep (Heavenly Recordings).

In October 2011, Colorama released Llyfr Lliwio (Colouring Book), which was their first predominantly Welsh-language collection. During this period Ellis was a member of Roddy Frame's touring band.

August 2012 saw their fifth album release - Good Music, produced by Edwyn Collins and Sebastian Lewsley, and released on Collins's new AED Records label, followed by a 12-inch single, Hapus? (Happy?), on Aficionado Recordings in November 2012.

In autumn 2012, Ellis toured Asia playing keyboards, guitar and percussion with the Pretenders.

In 2013, Ellis focused on studio work, recording with Edwyn Collins, Gemma Ray, Roddy Frame and in early 2014, Japanese artists Quruli. He also produced and arranged the second album, Relic for Emma Tricca, released by Finders Keepers / Bird Records in May 2014 and co-produced the first album by Nev Cottee, Stations (Roleplay Records).

In 2014, Colorama released a new EP, Heaven's Hotel, a new album TEMARI, followed by a split single, Yn Rhydiau'r Afon / Forget Tomorrow with The Joy Formidable.

A compilation of all of Ellis's Welsh songs as Colorama was released in November 2014, entitled Dere Mewn!, on his own, new Agati label.

Ellis collaborated with Edwyn Collins and Seb Lewsley on the soundtrack to the film The Possibilities Are Endless, composing much of its original score, which opened in October 2014 to great critical success, winning the Mojo 'Film of the Year' Award.

February 2015 saw Ellis release his first album as Zarelli, Soft Rains on the Seriés Aphōnos label – a mostly instrumental synthesizer record, featuring the voice of Leonard Nimoy reading the Ray Bradbury short story There Will Come Soft Rains. 
Soft Rains received a nomination for the Welsh Music Prize 2015.

In June 2015 the LP Red Kite by Sarah Cracknell of Saint Etienne was released, which was co-produced, co-written and arranged by Ellis. A single, Nothing Left To Talk About (featuring Nicky Wire of Manic Street Preachers) reached Number 1 in the UK vinyl singles chart on its release. A collection of instrumentals from the album, Kites, was released in September 2016, also on Cherry Red Records.

Early in 2016, Ellis began presenting an ongoing weekly radio show, X Marks The Spot on Soho Radio in London. He also presented a series called Antur Sonig on the Welsh language station BBC Radio Cymru Mwy during the autumn of 2016.

A Welsh language collaborative album, Bendith made by Carwyn Ellis with the folk trio, Plu was released on Ellis's Agati label in October 2016., followed by a five track EP which was released on the Aficionado Recordings label in February 2017.
A documentary film about the making of the album, Bendith: Yn Fyw O Acapela was broadcast on S4C in November 2016. The Bendith album received a nomination for the inaugural Welsh Music Prize 2017 and went on to win the Welsh Language Album of the Year 2017 award at National Eisteddfod of Wales that same year.

Ellis's collaboration with Sarah Cracknell continued into 2017 with the release of Saint Etienne's critically acclaimed Home Counties album which featured two songs co-written and co-produced by Ellis. A single, Dive which was produced and co-written by Ellis was released in September 2017, and reached Number 1 in the UK vinyl singles chart on its release.

He continued to work with Edwyn Collins through 2016 and early 2017 on new recordings, including a collaborative song, Fulmar released in August 2017 as part of the Avocet Revisited EP, commissioned by Earth Recordings as a companion piece to Bert Jansch's 1979 album, Avocet.

In May 2017, Ellis resumed touring with The Pretenders, again playing keyboards, guitar and percussion. In October 2017, a special edition version of their album ALONE which included a live bonus disc was released.

Some Things Just Take Time came out in September 2017 on the Wonderfulsound label, and showed the group taking a more acoustic, folk-influenced direction. 

2018 saw the tenth anniversary re-issue of Colorama’s debut album, Cookie Zoo, made available for the first time outside of Japan via a new Madrid-based record label, Banana & Louie Records.

In 2019, Ellis embarked on the first solo project under his own name, Carwyn Ellis & Rio 18. A collaborative project sung in Welsh and recorded mainly in Rio de Janeiro, it was produced by legendary Brazilian producer, Alexandre Kassin who was introduced to Ellis by Chrissie Hynde who suggested they work together during The Pretenders tour of South America in early 2018. Musicians who collaborated on the project include Alexandre Kassin, Domenico Lancellotti, André Siqueira, Shawn Lee, Nina Miranda, Manoel Cordeiro, Georgia Ruth and Gwion Llewelyn. A documentary film on the making of the record, Carwyn Ellis: Ar Y Cei Yn Rio was shown on S4C (Channel 4 Wales) in March 2019 and went on to win the Best Welsh language short Film award at the Wales International Documentary Festival. The album, Joia! came out in June 2019.

In 2020, Ellis releases Single Cherry Blossom Promenade & EP Ti to raise funds for personal protective equipment (PPE) for Welsh health and care workers. Ellis was initially inspired by his record label in Madrid, Banana And Louie Records, taking part in Music for Gloves and contributing a couple of songs himself to help provide PPE in Spain.

During the UK lockdown, the eighth full-length album under the Colorama project Chaos Wonderland was released on 31 July 2020. 

The second album from his solo project Carwyn Ellis & Rio 18 called Mas was also released on 25 February 2021. Mas is a truly international project, featuring players from Wales, Brazil, Venezuela, Argentina, France, England and the USA.

The most recent album Yn Rio by the Carwyn Ellis & Rio 18 with the BBC National Orchestra of Wales was released on 22 October 2021, originally performed live and broadcast in March 2021 on BBC Radio Cymru & BBC Radio 6 Music.

Discography

Studio albums

Carwyn Ellis & Rio 18

Colorama

Carwyn Ellis

Bendith

Zarelli

Edwyn Collins & Carwyn Ellis

Edwyn Collins, Carwyn Ellis, Sebastian Lewsley

With Edwyn Collins

With The Pretenders

With Saint Etienne

With Sarah Cracknell

With Tracyanne & Danny

With Gemma Ray

With The Rails

With Fabienne Delsol

With Raf Rundell

With Nev Cottee

With Emma Tricca

With Quruli

With Roddy Frame

With Shane MacGowan & Friends

With Dan Sartain

With The Keys

With Lay Low

With Pete Molinari

With James Hunter

With Simon Scott

With Bap Kennedy

With Proud Mary

With John's Children

With North Mississippi Allstars

With Southern Fly

With Unkle

Remixes

Saint Etienne

John Stammers

AM & Shawn Lee

Soundtracks / scores

The Guts of The Sea

The Possibilities Are Endless

The World Is Not Enough

References

External links
IN CONVERSATION: Colorama’s Carwyn Ellis on new ‘Chaos Wonderland’ album
Fred Perry Subculture : Carwyn Ellis Interview
Willwork4funk : Carwyn Ellis Biography
BarKino #55 – A World with Carwyn Ellis - 2021 interview with Pedro Montenegro on Soho Radio
PODCAST: Show Me Magic! Dydd Miwsig Cymru/Welsh Language Music Day special with Carwyn Ellis & Cath Holland - 2020 interview with Cath Holland on God Is in The Tv
Carwyn Ellis yn cyfri Bendith-ion - 2017 interview with Owain Schiavone at Y Selar (Welsh language music magazine)
In Conversation with Carwyn Ellis - 2015 interview with Graham Tomlinson at Wales Arts Review
The changing man - Carwyn Ellis at Western Mail (2013)
BBC's musical biography of Colorama
Playlists with Colorama
Carwyn Ellis discogs

1973 births
Living people
Welsh-language singers
Welsh singer-songwriters
Psychedelic folk musicians
Alumni of the Royal Academy of Music
Welsh multi-instrumentalists
21st-century Welsh male singers
Place of birth missing (living people)
British male singer-songwriters